Jugaaḍ (or "Jugaaṛ") is a colloquial Indo-Aryan word, which refers to a non-conventional, frugal innovation, often termed a "hack". It could also refer to an innovative fix or a simple work-around, a solution that bends the rules, or a resource that can be used in such a way. It is also often used to signify creativity: to make existing things work, or to create new things with meager resources.

Jugaad
is increasingly accepted as a management technique and is recognized all over the world as an acceptable form of frugal engineering at peak. Companies in Southeast Asia are adopting jugaad as a practise to reduce research and development costs. Jugaad also applies to any kind of creative and out-of-the-box thinking or life hacks that maximize resources for a company and its stakeholders.

According to author and professor Jaideep Prabhu, jugaad is an "important way out of the current economic crisis in developed economies and also holds important lessons for emerging economies".

Etymology and variants
It is pronounced as jugaad or jugaadh in Hindi, while in Punjabi and Urdu it is pronounced as jugaar, with a hard "R" sound that can be misunderstood by non-native speakers as jugaad.

One potential origin is yog(a) meaning "joining" or "union", a cognate of yoke. In Tamil it is translated as உத்தரம். There are similar idioms in the Southern Indian languages (for example, thattikootu (to ‘put together’) or oppeeru (‘fixing’ or ‘getting’) in Malayalam; or mazhattu ('to distract') in Tamil). 

Another view is that the word originates from the Sanskrit word yukti which means "a solution (to a problem)". This view is the most likely one. The Yoga origins have no bridging words or ideas. Yukati lead to the word 'Jugat' meaning 'solution' and 'jugti' meaning 'one who can find solutions' in Punjabi. In Punjabi we can create a nonsense word to make a pair that goes together. If 'pani- pooni peo'..'drink water wooter' literally. So we say 'have you found a jugat jugad' for this problem?

Jugaad roughly corresponds to do-it-yourself (DIY) in the US, hacking or a bodge in the UK, urawaza (裏技) in Japanese, tapullo in parts of Italy, tǔ fǎ  (土法) in China, Trick 17 in Germany, gambiarra in Brazil, système D. in France, jua kali in Kenya, or Number 8 wire in New Zealand; in addition, equivalent words within South Africa are ’n boer maak ’n plan in Afrikaans, izenzele in Zulu,  iketsetse in Sotho, and itirele in Tswana.

Jugaad and legality
Yamini Narayanan is an
animal life defender who argues that Jugaad is a key resource for progress in obstructionist
environments like slow, inefficient, or corrupt bureaucracies and governance institutions,
or when the activity is illegal. Depending on context, intention, and the informal political
economy, jugaad can be legal, unauthorized, or even criminal. Yamini stresses that
jugaad covers a broad set of complex practices,
argumentation, and innovations, that have also been used in concealments in the slaughter of cows throughout
India.

Low-cost vehicle
Jugaad can also refer to a homemade or locally made vehicle in India, Pakistan and Bangladesh. They are made by local mechanics using wooden planks, metal sheets and parts taken from different machines and vehicles.

One type of jugaad is a quadricycle, a vehicle made of wooden planks and old SUV parts, variously known as kuddukka and peter rehra in North India. However, jugaad could be used as a term for any low cost vehicle which typically costs around Rs. 50,000 (about US$800). Jugaads are powered by diesel engines originally intended to power agricultural irrigation pumps. They are known for poor brakes, and cannot go faster than about 60 km/h (37 mph). The vehicle often carries more than 20 people at a time in remote locations and poor road conditions. 

Though no statistical data is available, it is reported that there are a number of instances of failing brakes, requiring a passenger to jump off and manually apply a wooden block as a brake. As part of research for his 2013 book, Innovation and a Global Knowledge Economy in India, Thomas Birtchnell, a lecturer of Sustainable Communities at University of Wollongong, Australia, found that of 2,139 cases of road traffic casualties in 72 hours at J N Medical College hospital in Aligarh, 13.88% of pedestrian casualties were due to jugaad. It was stated by Minister of State for Road Transport and Highways Pon Radhakrishnan that jugaads do not conform to the specifications of a Motor Vehicle under the Motor Vehicles Act, 1988. These vehicles hence do not have any vehicle registration plate and they are not registered with the Regional Transport Office (RTO). Hence, no road tax is paid on them, neither there exists any official count of such vehicles.

Jugaads are not officially recognized as road-worthy, and despite a few proposals to regulate them, vote-bank politics have trumped safety concerns. The improvised vehicles have now become rather popular as a means to transport all manner of burdens, from lumber to steel rods to school children. For safety reasons the Government of India has officially banned jugaad vehicles.

Another type of jugaad called bike-rehra or motorcycle-rehri, a motorcycle, moped or scooter modified into motorized trikes are used in Indian Punjab province and its neighboring states.  

Another type of jugaad called phat-phatri rickshaw or phatphatiya rickshaw, WWII-era Harley Davidson motorcycles modified into motorized trikes were earlier used in New Delhi.

A variant of the jugaad vehicle in Tamil Nadu in South India is the meen body vandi.  This roughly translates to "fish bed vehicle" because they originated among local fishermen who needed a quick and cheap transport system to transport fish. It is a motorized tri-wheeler (derived from the non-motorized variant) with a heavy-duty suspension and a motorcycle engine—typically recycled from Czech Yezdi or Enfield Bullet vehicles. Its origins are typical of other jugaadu innovations—dead fish are typically considered unhygienic, and vehicles that carry them cannot be typically used to carry anything else. Similar vehicles can be found throughout much of Southeast Asia.

Another variant of the jugaad called chakkda rickshaw, a motorcycle modified into a tri-wheeler with truck wheels in the rear is used in Gujarat. 

The variant of jugaad in Pakistan is a motorcycle made into a trike called chand-gari meaning "Moon Car" or chingchee after the Chinese company Jinan Qingqi Co. LTD who first introduced these to the market. 

Today, a jugaad is one of the most cost-effective transportation solutions for rural Indians, Pakistanis and Bangladeshis.

See also

Frugal innovation  
Life hacking
Peter Rehra
Rickshaw
Pulled rickshaw
Cycle rickshaw
Auto rickshaw
E-rickshaw
Tanga
Ekka
Transport in India
Transport in Pakistan
Transport in Bangladesh

Similar terms:
Bodge, an English term of similar meaning
Chindōgu, a Japanese term for deliberately "un-useful" inventions, created as a hobby and entertainment.
Urawaza, a Japanese term for life hacking 
Redneck technology, an American term of similar meaning for innovations or improvisation using locally available materials
Gung-ho, a technique of guerilla industry employed at the Chinese Industrial Cooperatives in WWII
Kludge, an American-English term of similar meaning
Number 8 wire, a New Zealand term of similar meaning
System D, a French term for a manner of responding to challenges with quick thinking and improvisation
Gambiarra in Brazilian Portuguese, or desenrascar in European Portuguese, is an improvised solution using available materials or techniques.

Notes

Further reading 
 
 
 
 
 

Hindi words and phrases
Indian slang